High Five (BTI-Tn-5B1-4) is an insect cell line that originated from the ovarian cells of the cabbage looper, Trichoplusia ni. It was developed by the Boyce Thompson Institute for Plant Research.

High Five cells have become one of the most commonly used cell lines for recombinant protein expression using baculovirus or transfection, and have been demonstrated to express more recombinant protein than other lepidopteran cell lines, such as Sf9 cells. The High Five cells have been used to produce the VLP-based HPV vaccine Cervarix.

They can be grown in the absence of serum, and can be cultured in a loose attached state or in suspension High Five cells produce abundant microRNAs (miRNAs), small interfering RNAs (siRNAs), and PIWI-interacting RNAs (piRNAs), making it suitable to study all three types of small silencing RNAs.

The High Five cell line, like other cell lines, has been found to host a non-pathogenic adventitious alphanodavirus. Researchers at the Boyce Thompson Institute were able to isolate virus-free sub-clones, named Tnao38 and Tnms42.

References

External links
Cellosaurus entry for High Five
Cellosaurus entry for virus-free sub-clone Tnao38
Cellosaurus entry for virus-free sub-clone Tnms42
High Five resource at the Boyce Thompson Institute

Insect cell lines